Al Mujahidi (born January 1, 1942) is a Bangladeshi poet. He was awarded Ekushey Padak in 2003 by the Government of Bangladesh for his contribution to literature.

Career
Mujahidi started publishing poems in 1952 and as of 2004 has published 52 books of poems. He has been the literary editor of The Daily Ittefaq.

References

1942 births
Living people
20th-century Bangladeshi poets
Recipients of the Ekushey Padak
Bangladeshi male poets
20th-century male writers